The 2006 2. divisjon season was the third highest football (soccer) league for men in Norway.

26 games were played in 4 groups, with 3 points given for wins and 1 for draws. Notodden, Skeid, Mandalskameratene and Raufoss were promoted to the First Division. Number twelve, thirteen and fourteen were relegated to the 3. divisjon. The winning teams from each of the 24 groups in the 3. divisjon each faced a winning team from another group in a playoff match, resulting in 12 playoff winners which were promoted to the 2. divisjon.

League tables

Group 1

Group 2

Group 3

Group 4

Top goalscorers
 27 goals:
  Kenneth Kvalheim, Notodden
 23 goals:
  Andreas Moen, Lørenskog
  Christian Torbjørnsen, Groruddalen
  Peter Samuelsson, Nybergsund
 22 goals:
  Øystein Rogstad, Skeid
 20 goals:
  Jarle Wee, Vard
 19 goals:
  Fredrik William Henriksen, Flekkerøy
 18 goals:
  Vegard Alstad Sunde, Levanger
 17 goals:
  Kim Holmen, Lørenskog
  Kim Roger Strand, Eidsvold Turn
  Foday Scattred, Gjøvik-Lyn

Promotion playoff

References
Goalscorers

Norwegian Second Division seasons
3
Norway
Norway